The 2019–20 Sheffield Shield season was the 118th season of the Sheffield Shield, the domestic first-class cricket competition in Australia. It began on 10 October 2019 and was scheduled to finish on 31 March 2020. The first four rounds took place prior to the international Test series against Pakistan, and in addition the season breaks for the Big Bash League. Victoria were the defending champions.

In December 2019, during the sixth round match between Victoria and Western Australia at the Melbourne Cricket Ground, play was suspended after 40 overs on the first day due to a dangerous pitch. Following another inspection on the second day, the match was called off. During the same round, the match at the Sydney Cricket Ground between New South Wales and Queensland was played under a smoke cloud from the Australian bushfires.

The final round of matches and the final were cancelled due to the COVID-19 pandemic. The title was subsequently awarded to New South Wales, who finished on top of the points table after the nine rounds that were played. It was the 47th time that New South Wales had won the title. On 25 March 2020, Cricket Australia named Moises Henriques and Nic Maddinson as the joint winners of player of the season.

Points table

Round-Robin stage

Round 1

Round 2

Round 3

Round 4

Round 5

Round 6

Round 7

Round 8

Round 9

Round 10

Final

Statistics

Most runs

Most wickets

Broadcasting
All Sheffield Shield matches were exclusively streamed live and free on Cricket Australia's official website, with Fox Cricket originally scheduled to show the final.

References

External links
 Series home at ESPN Cricinfo

Sheffield Shield
Sheffield Shield
Sheffield Shield seasons
Sheffield Shield
Sheffield Shield season